The following is a timeline of the history of the city of Sydney, New South Wales, Australia.

Pre-Colonial

50,000–45,000 BP – Near Penrith, a far western suburb of Sydney, numerous Aboriginal stone tools were found in Cranebrook Terraces gravel sediments dating to this time period; at first when these results were new they were controversial. More recently in 1987 and 2003, dating of the same strata has revised and corroborated these dates.
30,000 BP – Radiocarbon dating suggests human activity occurred in and around the Sydney basin, as evidenced by an archaeological dig in Parramatta, in Western Sydney. The finds show that the Aboriginal Australians in that region used charcoal, stone tools and possible ancient campfires.
21,100–17,800 BP – Stone artifact assemblages dating to this time period discovered in Shaws Creek (near Hawkesbury River) and in Blue Mountains. A rock shelter with flakes dating to this period discovered near Nepean River.
5,000–7000 BP – The Sydney rock engravings, a form of Australian Aboriginal rock art consisting of carefully drawn images of people, animals, or symbols, date to this time period. 
4,000–2,000 BC – The first backed stone artifacts developed, such as blades and spears. The stones would drill, scrape, cut and grind material. They were also associated with woodworking.
1,000–500 BC – Bone and shell usage dating to this period discovered. They would've been attached to fishing spear prongs, which would mean that multi-pronged fishing spears occurred at this time. The evidence of spear-throwing is suggested by an excavated shell in Balmoral Beach.

18th–19th centuries

 1770 – Lieutenant (later Captain) James Cook, in command of HMS Endeavour, sighted the east coast of Australia and landed at a bay in what is now southern Sydney.
 1788 – Sydney founded as British penal settlement following arrival of the First Fleet of eleven vessels under the command of Captain Arthur Phillip; French vessels under the command of Lapérouse land in Botany Bay.
 1792 – Burial Ground established.
 1796 – Population: 2,953.
 1797 – Prospect, a western Sydney suburb, became the boundary between colonists and indigenous Australians. Hostility grew where a state of guerrilla warfare existed between indigenous people and the settler communities at Prospect and Parramatta. The aboriginal people were led by their leader, Pemulwuy, a member of the Bidjigal tribe who occupied the land.
 1803 – Sydney Gazette newspaper begins publication.
 1804 – Fort Philip construction begins.
 1808 – Rum Rebellion.
 1810 – Macquarie Street laid out.
 1816
 Royal Botanic Gardens open.
 Sydney Hospital built.
 1817 – Bank of New South Wales established.
 1819 – Hyde Park Barracks built.
 1820 – Devonshire Street Cemetery established.
 1823 – Sydney Royal Easter Show begins.
 1824 – St James' Church consecrated.
 1825 – New South Wales Legislative Council established in Sydney.
 1827 – Australian Museum established.
 1831 – Weekly Sydney Herald newspaper begins publication.
 1833
 Sydney Mechanics' School of Arts founded.
 Randwick Racecourse opened.
 1837 – Government House  and Botany-Sydney aqueduct built.
 1838 – David Jones (shop) in business.
 1839 – Cockatoo Island prison in operation.
 1840 – Farmers & Co. in business.
 1841 – Darlinghurst Gaol in operation.
 1842
 City incorporated; city council elected.
 Area of city: 11.65 square kilometres (approximate).
 Roman Catholic Archdiocese of Sydney established.
 1850
 University of Sydney established.
 Freeman's Journal newspaper begins publication.
 1854
 Sydney Cricket Ground opens.
 St Paul's College founded.
 1855
 First New South Wales Government Railways train operates from Redfern to Parramatta
 Sydney Mint established in General Hospital and Dispensary building.
 1856
 First Pyrmont Bridge built.
 St Philip's Church rebuilt.
 1857 – St John's College founded.
 1858 – Sydney Observatory built.
 1859 – Parliamentary electoral districts of East Sydney and West Sydney created.
 1861 – Population: 95,000 city and suburbs.
 1868
 Belmore Park opens.
 St Andrew's Cathedral consecrated.
 1869 – Sydney Free Public Library established.
 1871 – Sydney Exchange and Academy of Art founded.
 1874 - Art Gallery of New South Wales opened.
 1877 – Waverley Cemetery established near city.
 1878 – Robinson-Finlay wedding takes place.
 1879 St Aloysius College, Jesuit school established.
 Sydney Riot of 1879.
 Sydney International Exhibition held; Garden Palace built.
 Art Gallery of New South Wales opens.
 Dymocks Bookseller in business.
 New South Wales Zoological Society founded.
 Royal National Park established near city.
 1881 – Population: 237,300 city and suburbs.
 1882
 Sydney Showground opens.
 St Mary's Cathedral consecrated.
 1883
 Melbourne–Sydney railway built.
 Sydney High School and Sydney Wharf Labourers Union established.
 1889
 Sydney Town Hall built.
 Women's College and Sydney Church of England Grammar School founded.
 1890
 Sydney Town Hall Grand Organ installed.
 Kerry photography studio in business.
 1891
 General Post Office built.
 Population: 399,270 city and suburbs.
 Australia Hotel in business.
 1892 – Strand Arcade opens.
 1893 – Technological Museum opens.
 1894 – Photographic Society of New South Wales founded.
 1895 – City Tattersalls Club formed.
 1898 – Queen Victoria Building constructed.
 1900 – Sydney Harbour Trust active, White Australia Policy founded.

20th century

1900s–1940s

 1901
 City becomes part of the new Commonwealth of Australia.
 Royal Australian Historical Society founded.
 Population: 112,137 city; 369,693 suburbs.
 1902 – Second Pyrmont Bridge built.
 1903 – Glebe Island Bridge and Her Majesty's Theatre rebuilt. Bronte Surf Club became the first Surf Club as noted in Bronte by S. Vesper  in his history of the Bronte Surf Club
 1904 – Electric street lighting installed.
 1905 – Hordern's Palace Emporium in business.
 1906
 Central railway station opens.
 Bondi Surf Bathers' Life Saving Club active.
 1907
 20 October: Bathing costume protests.
 Melbourne–Sydney telephone begins operating.
 1908
 Camperdown becomes part of city.
 New South Wales Rugby League Premiership formed
 1909 – City of Sydney Library established.
 1910 – The Sun newspaper begins publication.
 1912 – Culwulla Chambers built.
 1913 – Parcel Post Office built at Railway Square.
 1915 – Sydney Conservatorium of Music established.
 1916 – 14 February: Liverpool riot of 1916.
 1917 – J.G. Park photography studio in business (approximate date).
 1920
 18 February: World's "first" swimsuit competition (beauty contest) held in Sydney.
 Hurlstone Park Choral Society formed.
 1921- Bronte Splashers Winter Swimming Club was formed becoming the first Winter Swimming Club in Australia
1924
 Sydney Airport begins operating.
 Hordern Pavilion built.
 1926
 Electric train services begin
 1927
 St James railway station opens.
 Sydney Cenotaph erected.
 Hyde Park built.

 1928
 Capitol Theatre opens.
 Government Savings Bank building constructed.
 1929
 State Theatre opens.
 Sun Building constructed.
 1930
 Modern Art Centre opens.
 Grace Building constructed.

 1932
 Sydney Harbour Bridge, Town Hall railway station, and Wynyard railway station open.
 Dymocks building constructed.
 1935 – Luna Park and Astoria Theatre open.
 1938 – City hosts 1938 British Empire Games.
 1939 – AWA Tower built.

 1940 – St. James Theatre opens.
 1941 – Daily Mirror newspaper begins publication.
 1942 – May–June: Attack on Sydney Harbour by Japanese forces.
 1946 – Sydney Symphony Orchestra active.
 1947 – Population: 95,852 city; 1,484,434 metro.
 1949 – Alexandria, Darlington, Erskineville, Glebe, Newtown, Paddington, Redfern, and Waterloo become part of the city.

1950s–1990s
 1953 – Sydney Sun-Herald newspaper in publication.
 1954 – Sydney Film Festival begins.
 1956 – ATN Channel 7 television begins broadcasting.
 1961 – Last Trams in Sydney operate
 1964 – Paddington Society founded.
 – Gladesville Bridge opened
 1967 – Australia Square hi-rise built.
 1968
 South Sydney Municipal Council created.
 Sister city relationship established with San Francisco, USA.
 1971 – City of Sydney Strategic Plan created.
 1971 – Green Bans begin in Hunters Hill
 1972 – Construction workers take over the Sydney Opera House
 1972 – Aboriginal Medical Service established in Redfern.
 1973 – Sydney Opera House opens.
 1977
 Granville train disaster
 Sydney Festival begins.
 MLC Centre opens
 1979
 9 June: 1979 Sydney Ghost Train fire.
 Martin Place pedestrianised.
 Martin Place railway station opens.
 Sydney Gay and Lesbian Mardi Gras begins.
 Sydney Theatre Company founded.
 1981 – Sydney Tower opened
 1983 – Beverly Hills Twin Cinema in business.
 1985
 Parliament House rebuilt.
 Granny Smith Festival begins in Eastwood.
 1987 – University of Sydney's Research Institute for Asia and the Pacific established.
 1988
 Sydney Monorail opens
 University of Technology, Sydney and University of Sydney's Centre for Peace and Conflict Studies established.
 Sydney Convention & Exhibition Centre and Powerhouse Museum open.
 Australian Bicentenary events staged.
 Bicentennial Park, Homebush Bay and Mount Annan Botanic Garden open near city.
 1989
 South Sydney City Council established.
 Area of city: 6.19 square kilometres.

 1990 – Sydney Children's Choir founded.
 1991 - Sydney Park established.
 1992 – Sydney Harbour Tunnel opened
 1993 – South Sydney Heritage Society founded.
 1994 – Sydney International Aquatic Centre opens.
 1995 – Anzac Bridge opens.
 1997 – Asian Australian Artists’ Association Gallery 4A opens.
 The Star, Sydney casino opens
 1998
 March: State Hockey Centre opens.
 July: 1998 Sydney water crisis
 BridgeClimb Sydney commences
 1999
 6 March: Stadium Australia opens.
 4 October: Sydney Super Dome opens.
 8 December: NSW Tennis Centre opens.
 City Recital Hall opens.
 2000
 September: City hosts 2000 Summer Olympics & 2000 Summer Paralympics
 City of Sydney Historical Association founded.

21st century

2000s
 2001
 Sydney Harbour Federation Trust established.
 Population: 4,128,272.
 2003 – Lowy Institute for International Policy headquartered in city.
 2004
 14 February: 2004 Redfern riots.
 City of South Sydney becomes part of City of Sydney.
 2005
 December: 2005 Cronulla riots occur near city.
 Cross City Tunnel opens.
 Bankstown Bites Food Festival and Sydney Comedy Festival begin.
 2007
 September: Asia-Pacific Economic Cooperation forum meets in city.
 Sydney Underground Film Festival begins.
 2009
 Institute for Economics and Peace headquartered in city.
 Festival of Dangerous Ideas begins.
 First Vivid Sydney festival

2010s

 2011
 Population: 4,028,524.
 2014
 2014 Sydney hostage crisis
 2017
 Population reaches 5 million, according to the 2016 Australian census.
 2019 
 Completion of the Sydney Metro Northwest, the first line of the upcoming Sydney Metro, Australia's first rapid transit system.

See also
 History of Sydney
 List of mayors, lord mayors and administrators of Sydney
 List of Governors of New South Wales, headquartered in Sydney

References

Bibliography

Published in the 19th century
 
 
 
  (1962 facsimile published by Ure Smith)

Published in the 20th century
 
 
 
 
 
 
 
 
 
 K. W. Robinson, 'Sydney, 1850–1952, A Comparison of Developments in the Heart of the City', Australian Geographer, Vol. 6, 1952–1956
 Nineteenth Century Sydney: Essays in Urban History, M. Kelly (ed.), Sydney University Press, 1978
 
 
 
 P. Webber, ed. (1988), The Design of Sydney. Sydney: Law Book Company.
 Shirley H. Fitzgerald, Sydney 1842–1992 (Hale and Iremonger, Sydney, 1992)
 
 
 J. Birmingham. (1999), Leviathan: The Unauthorised Biography of Sydney. Knopf.

Published in the 21st century
 Sydney: the Emergence of a World City. Melbourne: Oxford University Press, 2000.
 P. Spearritt. (2000), Sydney's Century: a History. Sydney: University of New South Wales Press.

External links

 
 
 Items related to Sydney, various dates (via Europeana).
 Items related to Sydney, various dates (via Digital Public Library of America).

 
 
Sydney
New South Wales timelines